Stokes is a locality in the Shire of Carpentaria, Queensland, Australia.

Geography 
The Leichhardt River forms the western boundary of the locality. Together with the Alexandra River, the Cloncurry River, the Flinders River and the Saxby River and numerous creeks, they all flow from south to north through the locality. The Alexandra River becomes a tributary of the Leichhardt River at the north-western point of the locality and the Cloncurry River and Saxby Rivers both become tributaries of the Flinders River in the north-east of the locality, leaving only the Leichhardt and Flinders Rivers to continue to flow into the Gulf of Carpentaria to the north.

The Burke Developmental Road passes through the locality from north-east to south. The Wills Developmental Road passes through the south-west of the locality. The roads intersect at the neighbouring locality of Four Ways to the south. The land is entirely used for pastoral leases and is mostly flat at approximately 50 metres above sea level.

The flatness of the land gives emphasis to a hill locally known as Bang Bang Jump Up on the Burke Developmental Road as it is the only sudden change in elevation within a very long distance and is of interest to tourists both as a lookout over the surrounding countryside and because they find the name amusing.

History 
The locality is named after John Lort Stokes , who was commanding officer of HMS Beagle from 1841 to 1846.

References

External links

Shire of Carpentaria
Localities in Queensland